José Roberto Fernández Filho (born 14 February 1980) is a Brazilian equestrian. He competed in two events at the 2012 Summer Olympics.

References

External links
 

1980 births
Living people
Brazilian male equestrians
Olympic equestrians of Brazil
Equestrians at the 2012 Summer Olympics
Sportspeople from São Paulo
South American Games gold medalists for Brazil
South American Games silver medalists for Brazil
South American Games bronze medalists for Brazil
South American Games medalists in equestrian
Competitors at the 2006 South American Games
Competitors at the 2014 South American Games
Competitors at the 2022 South American Games